Nipped-B-like protein (NIPBL), also known as SCC2 or delangin is a protein that in humans is encoded by the NIPBL gene. NIPBL is required for the association of cohesin with DNA and is the major subunit of the cohesin loading complex. Heterozygous mutations in NIPBL account for an estimated 60% of case of Cornelia de Lange Syndrome.

Structure and Interactions 

NIPBL is a large hook-shaped protein containing HEAT repeats. NIPBL forms a complex with MAU2 (Scc4 in budding yeast) known as the cohesin loading complex. As this name suggests NIPBL and MAU2 are required for the initial association of cohesin with DNA.

Cohesin is thought to mediate enhancer-promoter interactions and generate Topologically associating domains (TADs). As well as mediating cohesion and regulating DNA architecture the cohesin complex is required for DNA repair by homologous recombination. Given that NIPBL is required for cohesin's association with DNA it is thought that NIPBL is also required for all of these processes. Consistently, inactivation of Nipbl results in the loss topologically associating domains and cohesion.

NIPBL binds dynamically to chromatin principally through an association with cohesin.  NIPBL’s movement within chromatin is consistent with a mechanism involving hopping between chromosomal cohesin rings. A cohesin-independent function in the regulation of gene expression has also been demonstrated for NIPBL.

Clinical significance 

Mutations in this gene result in Cornelia de Lange syndrome (CdLS), a disorder characterized by dysmorphic facial features, growth delay, limb reduction defects, and mental retardation. As these mutations are usually heterozygous, CdLS is caused by a reduction in the abundance of Nipbl not a complete loss. Experiments on cells from patients and mice indicate that the reduction is by less than half. It is not known why a reduction in Nipbl expression results in CdLS.

References